Bergen, historically Bjørgvin, is a city and municipality in Vestland county on the west coast of Norway. , its population is roughly 285,900. Bergen is the second-largest city in Norway. The city centre and northern neighbourhoods are on Byfjorden, 'the city fjord', and the city is surrounded by mountains; Bergen is known as the "city of seven mountains". Many of the extra-municipal suburbs are on islands. Bergen is the administrative centre of Vestland county. The city consists of eight boroughs: Arna, Bergenhus, Fana, Fyllingsdalen, Laksevåg, Ytrebygda, Årstad, and Åsane.

Trading in Bergen may have started as early as the 1020s. According to tradition, the city was founded in 1070 by King Olav Kyrre and was named Bjørgvin, 'the green meadow among the mountains'. It served as Norway's capital in the 13th century, and from the end of the 13th century became a bureau city of the Hanseatic League. Until 1789, Bergen enjoyed exclusive rights to mediate trade between Northern Norway and abroad and it was the largest city in Norway until the 1830s when it was overtaken by the capital, Christiania (now known as Oslo). What remains of the quays, Bryggen, is a World Heritage Site. The city was hit by numerous fires over the years. The Bergen School of Meteorology was developed at the Geophysical Institute starting in 1917, the Norwegian School of Economics was founded in 1936, and the University of Bergen in 1946. From 1831 to 1972, Bergen was its own county. In 1972 the municipality absorbed four surrounding municipalities and became a part of Hordaland county.

The city is an international center for aquaculture, shipping, the offshore petroleum industry and subsea technology, and a national centre for higher education, media, tourism and finance. Bergen Port is Norway's busiest in terms of both freight and passengers, with over 300 cruise ship calls a year bringing nearly a half a million passengers to Bergen, a number that has doubled in 10 years. Almost half of the passengers are German or British. The city's main football team is SK Brann and a unique tradition of the city is the buekorps. Natives speak a distinct dialect, known as Bergensk. The city features Bergen Airport, Flesland and Bergen Light Rail, and is the terminus of the Bergen Line. Four large bridges connect Bergen to its suburban municipalities.

Bergen has a mild winter climate, though with a lot of precipitation. From December to March, Bergen can, in rare cases, be up to 20 °C warmer than Oslo, even though both cities are at about 60° North. The Gulf Stream keeps the sea relatively warm, considering the latitude, and the mountains protect the city from cold winds from the north, north-east and east.

History

The city of Bergen was traditionally thought to have been founded by king Olav Kyrre, son of Harald Hardråde in 1070AD, four years after the Viking Age in England ended with the Battle of Stamford Bridge. Modern research has, however, discovered that a trading settlement had already been established in the 1020s or 1030s.

Bergen gradually assumed the function of capital of Norway in the early 13th century, as the first city where a rudimentary central administration was established. The city's cathedral was the site of the first royal coronation in Norway in the 1150s, and continued to host royal coronations throughout the 13th century. Bergenhus fortress dates from the 1240s and guards the entrance to the harbour in Bergen. The functions of the capital city were lost to Oslo during the reign of King Haakon V (1299–1319).

In the middle of the 14th century, North German merchants, who had already been present in substantial numbers since the 13th century, founded one of the four  of the Hanseatic League at Bryggen in Bergen. The principal export traded from Bergen was dried cod from the northern Norwegian coast, which started around 1100. The city was granted a monopoly for trade from the north of Norway by King Håkon Håkonsson (1217–1263). Stockfish was the main reason that the city became one of North Europe's largest centres for trade. By the late 14th century, Bergen had established itself as the centre of the trade in Norway. The Hanseatic merchants lived in their own separate quarter of the town, where Middle Low German was used, enjoying exclusive rights to trade with the northern fishermen who each summer sailed to Bergen. The Hansa community resented Scottish merchants who settled in Bergen, and on 9 November 1523 several Scottish households were targeted by German residents. Today, Bergen's old quayside, Bryggen, is on UNESCO's list of World Heritage Sites. 

In 1349, the Black Death was brought to Norway by an English ship arriving in Bergen. Later outbreaks occurred in 1618, 1629 and 1637, on each occasion taking about 3,000 lives. In the 15th century, the city was attacked several times by the Victual Brothers, and in 1429 they succeeded in burning the royal castle and much of the city. In 1665, the city's harbour was the site of the Battle of Vågen, when an English naval flotilla attacked a Dutch merchant and treasure fleet supported by the city's garrison. Accidental fires sometimes got out of control, and one in 1702 reduced most of the town to ashes.

Throughout the 15th and 16th centuries, Bergen remained one of the largest cities in Scandinavia, and it was Norway's biggest city until the 1830s, when the capital city of Oslo became the largest. From around 1600, the Hanseatic dominance of the city's trade gradually declined in favour of Norwegian merchants (often of Hanseatic ancestry), and in the 1750s, the Hanseatic  finally closed. During the 17th and 18th centuries, Bergen was involved in the Atlantic slave trade. Bergen-based slave trader Jørgen Thormøhlen, the largest shipowner in Norway, was the main owner of the slave ship Cornelia, which made two slave-trading voyages in 1673 and 1674 respectively; he also developed the city's industrial sector, particularly in the neighbourhood of Møhlenpris, which is named after him. Bergen retained its monopoly of trade with northern Norway until 1789.

Modern history 
Bergen was separated from Hordaland as a county of its own in 1831. It was established as a municipality on 1 January 1838 (see ). The rural municipality of Årstad was merged with Bergen on 1 July 1915.

During World War II, Bergen was occupied on the first day of the German invasion on 9 April 1940, after a brief fight between German ships and the Norwegian coastal artillery. The Norwegian resistance movement groups in Bergen were Saborg, Milorg, "", Sivorg,  and the Communist Party. On 20 April 1944, during the German occupation, the Dutch cargo ship  anchored off the Bergenhus Fortress, loaded with over 120 tons of explosives, and blew up, killing at least 150 people and damaging historic buildings. The city was subject to some Allied bombing raids, aimed at German naval installations in the harbour. Some of these caused Norwegian civilian casualties numbering about 100.

Bergen is also well known in Norway for the Isdal Woman, an unidentified person who was found dead at Isdalen ("Ice Valley") on 29 November 1970. The unsolved case encouraged international speculation over the years and it remains one of the most profound mysteries in recent Norwegian history.

The rural municipalities of Arna, Fana, Laksevåg, and Åsane were merged with Bergen on 1 January 1972. The city lost its status as a separate county on the same date, and Bergen is now a municipality, in the county of Vestland.

Fires
The city's history is marked by numerous great fires. In 1198, the  faction set fire to the city in connection with a battle against the  faction during the civil war. In 1248,  and  burned, and 11 churches were destroyed. In 1413 another fire struck the city, and 14 churches were destroyed. In 1428 the city was plundered by the Victual Brothers, and in 1455, Hanseatic merchants were responsible for burning down Munkeliv Abbey. In 1476,  burned down in a fire started by a drunk trader. In 1686 another great fire hit , destroying 231 city blocks and 218 boathouses. The greatest fire in history was in 1702, when 90% of the city was burned to ashes. In 1756, yet another fire at  burned down 1,500 buildings, and further great fires hit  in 1771 and 1901. In 1916, 300 buildings burned down in the city centre including the Swan pharmacy, the oldest pharmacy in Norway, and in 1955 parts of  burned down.

Toponymy
The full meaning is then "the meadow among the mountains". This is a suitable name: Bergen is often called "the city among the seven mountains". It was the playwright Ludvig Holberg who felt so inspired by the seven hills of Rome, that he decided that his home town must be blessed with a corresponding seven mountains – and locals still argue which seven they are.

In 1918, there was a campaign to reintroduce the Norse form  as the name of the city.

Geography

Bergen occupies most of the peninsula of Bergenshalvøyen in the district of Midthordland in mid-western Hordaland. Most of the urban area is on or close to a fjord or bay, although the urban area has several mountains. The city centre is surrounded by the Seven Mountains, although there is disagreement as to which of the nine mountains constitute these. Ulriken, Fløyen, Løvstakken and Damsgårdsfjellet are always included as well as three of Lyderhorn, Sandviksfjellet, Blåmanen, Rundemanen and Kolbeinsvarden.

Bergen is sheltered from the North Sea by the islands Askøy, Holsnøy (the municipality of Meland) and Sotra (the municipalities of Fjell and Sund). Bergen borders the municipalities Alver and Osterøy to the north, Vaksdal and Samnanger to the east, Os (Bjørnafjorden) and Austevoll to the south, and Øygarden and Askøy to the west.

Climate

Bergen has an oceanic climate (Köppen: Cfb), with mild summers and cool winters. Rainfall is plentiful in all seasons, along with intermittent snowfall during winter, which often melts quickly. The exceptionally plentiful precipitation that defines the city is caused by orographic lift, sometimes causing more than two months of consecutive rainy days. The city is therefore considered the rainiest city in Europe, although it is not the wettest "place" on the continent.

Bergen's weather is much warmer than the city's latitude (60.4° N) might suggest. Temperatures below −10 °C (14 °F) are rare. Summer temperatures sometimes reach the upper 20s, although temperatures over 30°C were previously only seen a few days each decade. The growing season in Bergen is exceptionally long for its latitude, more than 200 days. Its mild winters and proximity to the Gulf Stream provide the city with a plant hardiness zone of 8b and 9a depending on location; this zone is much more common below 50°N even in Europe, with cities as far south as Bordeaux, Thessaloniki and Istanbul falling into this category. The average date for the last overnight freeze (low below ) in spring is April 4 and average date for first freeze in autumn is November 7 giving a frost-free season of 216 days.

Extreme temperatures are also quite rare in the city.

The city is quite cloudy year round, although old sunshine hours data might have caused an underestimate of sunshine hours, due to the city's mountainside location. A new sun recorder was established at Bergen Airport, Flesland (a location with less terrain obscuring the sun) in December 2015, and this recorded 1,598 hours of sun annually during 2016–2020.

Demographics

, the municipality had a population of 286,930, making the population density 599 people per km2. Urban areas outside the city limits, as defined by Statistics Norway, consist of Indre Arna (6,536 residents on 1 January 2012), Fanahammeren (3,690), Ytre Arna (2,626), Hylkje (2,277) and Espeland (2,182).

People of Norwegian origin (those who have two parents born in Norway) make up 84.5% of Bergen's residents. In addition, 8.1% were first or second generation immigrants of Western background and 7.4% were first or second generation immigrants of non-Western background. The population grew by 4,549 people in 2009, a growth rate of 1,8%. Ninety-six percent of the population lives in urban areas. As of 2002, the average gross income for men above the age of 17 is 426,000 Norwegian krone (NOK), the average gross income for women above the age of 17 is NOK238,000, with the total average gross income being NOK330,000. In 2007, there were 104.6 men for every 100 women in the age group of 20–39. 22.8% of the population were under 17years of age, while 4.5% were 80 and above.

The immigrant population (those with two foreign-born parents) in Bergen, includes 42,169 individuals with backgrounds from more than 200 countries representing 15.5% of the city's population (2014). Of these, 50.2% have background from Europe, 28.9% from Asia, 13.1% from Africa, 5.5% from Latin America, 1.9% from North America, and 0.4% from Oceania. The immigrant population in Bergen in the period 1993–2008 increased by 119.7%, while the ethnic Norwegian population grew by 8.1% during the same period. The national average is 138.0% and 4.2%. The immigrant population has thus accounted for 43.6% of Bergen's population growth and 60.8% of Norway's population growth during the period 1993–2008, compared with 84.5% in Oslo.

The immigrant population in Bergen has changed a lot since 1970. As of 1 January 1986, there were 2,870 people with a non-Western immigrant background in Bergen. In 2006, this figure had increased to 14,630, so the non-Western immigrant population in Bergen was five times higher than in 1986. This is a slightly slower growth than the national average, which has sextupled during the same period. Also in relation to the total population in Bergen, the proportion of non-Westerns increased significantly. In 1986, the proportion of the total population in the municipality of non-Western background was 3.6%. In January 2006, people with a non-Western immigrant background accounted for 6 percent of the population in Bergen. The share of Western immigrants has remained stable at around 2% in the period. The number of Poles in Bergen rose from 697 in 2006 to 3,128 in 2010.

The Church of Norway is the largest denomination in Bergen, with 201,006 (79.74%) registered adherents in 2012. Bergen is the seat of the Diocese of Bjørgvin with Bergen Cathedral as its centrepiece, while St John's Church is the city's most prominent. As of 2012, the state church is followed by 52,059 irreligious, 4,947 members of various Protestant free churches, 3,873 actively registered Catholics, 2,707 registered Muslims, 816 registered Hindus, 255 registered Russian Orthodox and 147 registered Oriental Orthodox.

Cityscape

The city centre of Bergen lies in the west of the municipality, facing the fjord of Byfjorden. It is among a group of mountains known as the Seven Mountains, although the number is a matter of definition. From here, the urban area of Bergen extends to the north, west and south, and to its east is a large mountain massif. Outside the city centre and the surrounding neighbourhoods (i.e. Årstad, inner Laksevåg and Sandviken), the majority of the population lives in relatively sparsely populated residential areas built after 1950. While some are dominated by apartment buildings and modern terraced houses (e.g. Fyllingsdalen), others are dominated by single-family homes.

The oldest part of Bergen is the area around the bay of Vågen in the city centre. Originally centred on the bay's eastern side, Bergen eventually expanded west and southwards. Few buildings from the oldest period remain, the most significant being St Mary's Church from the 12th century. For several hundred years, the extent of the city remained almost constant. The population was stagnant, and the city limits were narrow. In 1702, seven-eighths of the city burned. Most of the old buildings of Bergen, including Bryggen (which was rebuilt in a mediaeval style), were built after the fire. The fire marked a transition from tar covered houses, as well as the remaining log houses, to painted and some brick-covered wooden buildings.

The last half of the 19th century saw a period of rapid expansion and modernisation. The fire of 1855 west of Torgallmenningen led to the development of regularly sized city blocks in this area of the city centre. The city limits were expanded in 1876, and Nygård, Møhlenpris and Sandviken were urbanized with large-scale construction of city blocks housing both the poor and the wealthy. Their architecture is influenced by a variety of styles; historicism, classicism and Art Nouveau. The wealthy built villas between Møhlenpris and Nygård, and on the side of Mount Fløyen; these areas were also added to Bergen in 1876. Simultaneously, an urbanization process was taking place in Solheimsviken in Årstad, at that time outside the Bergen municipality, centred on the large industrial activity in the area. The workers' homes in this area were poorly built, and little remains after large-scale redevelopment in the 1960s–1980s.

After Årstad became a part of Bergen in 1916, a development plan was applied to the new area. Few city blocks akin to those in Nygård and Møhlenpris were planned. Many of the worker class built their own homes, and many small, detached apartment buildings were built. After World War II, Bergen had again run short of land to build on, and, contrary to the original plans, many large apartment buildings were built in Landås in the 1950s and 1960s. Bergen acquired Fyllingsdalen from Fana municipality in 1955. Like similar areas in Oslo (e.g. Lambertseter), Fyllingsdalen was developed into a modern suburb with large apartment buildings, mid-rises, and some single-family homes, in the 1960s and 1970s. Similar developments took place beyond Bergen's city limits, for example in Loddefjord.

At the same time as planned city expansion took place inside Bergen, its extra-municipal suburbs also grew rapidly. Wealthy citizens of Bergen had been living in Fana since the 19th century, but as the city expanded it became more convenient to settle in the municipality. Similar processes took place in Åsane and Laksevåg. Most of the homes in these areas are detached row houses, single family homes or small apartment buildings. After the surrounding municipalities were merged with Bergen in 1972, expansion has continued in largely the same manner, although the municipality encourages condensing near commercial centres, future Bergen Light Rail stations, and elsewhere.

As part of the modernisation wave of the 1950s and 1960s, and due to damage caused by World War II, the city government ambitiously planned redevelopment of many areas in central Bergen. The plans involved demolition of several neighbourhoods of wooden houses, namely Nordnes, Marken, and Stølen. None of the plans was carried out in its original form; the Marken and Stølen redevelopment plans were discarded and that of Nordnes only carried out in the area that had been most damaged by war. The city council of Bergen had in 1964 voted to demolish the entirety of Marken, however, the decision proved to be highly controversial and the decision was reversed in 1974. Bryggen was under threat of being wholly or partly demolished after the fire of 1955, when a large number of the buildings burned to the ground. Instead of being demolished, the remaining buildings were restored and accompanied by reconstructions of some of the burned buildings.

Demolition of old buildings and occasionally whole city blocks is still taking place, the most recent major example being the 2007 razing of Jonsvollskvartalet at Nøstet.

Billboards are banned in the city.

Administration

Since 2000, the city of Bergen has been governed by a city government (byråd) based on the principle of parliamentarism. The government consists of seven government members called commissioners, and is appointed by the city council, the supreme authority of the city.

This is the political party breakdown of the current and historical city councils:

Boroughs

Bergen is divided into eight boroughs, as seen on the map to the right. Clockwise, starting with the northernmost, the boroughs are Åsane, Arna, Fana, Ytrebygda, Fyllingsdalen, Laksevåg, Årstad and Bergenhus. The city centre is located in Bergenhus. Parts of Fana, Ytrebygda, Åsane and Arna are not part of the Bergen urban area, explaining why the municipality has approximately 20,000 more inhabitants than the urban area.

Local borough administrations have varied since Bergen's expansion in 1972. From 1974, each borough had a politically chosen administration. From 1989, Bergen was divided into 12 health and social districts, each locally administered. From 2000 to 2004, the former organizational form with eight politically chosen local administrations was again in use and from 2008 through to 2010, a similar form existed where the local administrations had less power than previously.

(Pertaining to the table above: The acreage figures include fresh water and uninhabited mountain areas, except: 

Former borough: Sentrum
Sentrum (literally, "Centre") was a borough (with the same name as a present-day neighbourhood). The borough was numbered 01, and its perimeter was from Store Lungegårdsvann and Strømmen along Puddefjorden around Nordnes and over to Skuteviken, up Mt. Fløyen east of Langelivannet, on to Skansemyren and over Forskjønnelsen to Store Lungegårdsvann, south of the railroad tracks.

The population of the (now defunct) borough, numbered in 1994 more than 18,000 people.

Education

There are 64 elementary schools, 18 lower secondary schools and 20 upper secondary schools in Bergen, as well as 11 combined elementary and lower secondary schools. Bergen Cathedral School is the oldest school in Bergen and was founded by Pope Adrian IV in 1153.

The "Bergen School of Meteorology" was developed at the Geophysical Institute beginning in 1917, the Norwegian School of Economics was founded in 1936, and the University of Bergen in 1946.

The University of Bergen has 16,000 students and 3,000 staff, making it the third-largest educational institution in Norway. Research in Bergen dates back to activity at Bergen Museum in 1825, although the university was not founded until 1946. The university has a broad range of courses and research in academic fields and three national centres of excellence, in climate research, petroleum research and medieval studies. The main campus is located in the city centre. The university co-operates with Haukeland University Hospital within medical research. The Chr. Michelsen Institute is an independent research foundation established in 1930 focusing on human rights and development issues.

The Western Norway University of Applied Sciences, which has its main campus in Kronstad, has 16,000 students and 1800 staff. It focuses on professional education, such as teaching, healthcare and engineering. The college was created through amalgamation in 1994; campuses are spread around town but will be co-located at Kronstad. The Norwegian School of Economics is located in outer Sandviken and is the leading business school in Norway, having produced three Economy Nobel Prize laureates. The school has more than 3,000 students and approximately 400 staff. Other tertiary education institutions include the Bergen School of Architecture, the Bergen National Academy of the Arts, located in the city centre with 300 students, and the Norwegian Naval Academy located in Laksevåg. The Norwegian Institute of Marine Research has been located in Bergen since 1900. It provides research and advice relating to ecosystems and aquaculture. It has a staff of 700 people.

Economy

In August 2004, Time magazine named the city one of Europe's 14 "secret capitals" where Bergen's capital reign is acknowledged within maritime businesses and activities such as aquaculture and marine research, with the Institute of Marine Research (IMR) (the second-largest oceanography research centre in Europe) as a leading institution. Some of the world's largest aquaculture companies, such as Mowi and Lerøy are headquartered in the city. Shipowners based in  Bergen control a significant portion of the Norwegian merchant fleet, including shipowners such as Wilson, Odfjell and Gearbulk. The city has a large presence of financial institutions. Banks Sbanken and Sparebanken Vest are headquartered in the city. The Norwegian branches of insurance companies Tryg, DNB Livsforsikring and Nordea Liv are headquartered in Bergen, along with a significant presence of marine insurance companies, including Norwegian Hull Club. A number of banks maintain large corporate banking divisions in connection with shipping and aquaculture in the city.

Bergen is the main base for the Royal Norwegian Navy (at Haakonsvern) and its international airport Flesland is the main heliport for the Norwegian North Sea oil and gas industry, from where thousands of offshore workers commute to their work places onboard oil and gas rigs and platforms.

Tourism is an important income source for the city. The hotels in the city may be full at times, due to the increasing number of tourists and conferences. Bergen is recognized as the unofficial capital of the region known as Western Norway, and recognized and marketed as the gateway city to the world-famous fjords of Norway, and for that reason, it has become Norway's largest – and one of Europe's largest – cruise ship ports of call.

Transport

In 2013, the Avinor-operated airport served 6 million passengers. The airport serves as a hub for Scandinavian Airlines, Norwegian Air Shuttle and Widerøe; there are direct flights to 20 domestic and 53 international destinations. Bergen Port, operated by Bergen Port Authority, is the largest seaport in Norway.
In 2011, the port saw 264 cruise calls with 350,248 visitors, In 2009, the port handled 56million tonnes of cargo, making it the ninth-busiest cargo port in Europe. There are plans to move the port out of the city centre, but no location has been chosen. Fjord Line operates a cruiseferry service to Hirtshals, Denmark. Bergen is the southern terminus of Hurtigruten, the Coastal Express, which operates with daily services along the coast to Kirkenes. Passenger catamarans run from Bergen south to Leirvik and Sunnhordland, and north to Sognefjord and Nordfjord.

The city centre is surrounded by an electronic toll collection ring using the Autopass system. The main motorways consist of E39, which runs north–south through the municipality, E16, which runs eastwards, and National Road 555, which runs westwards. There are four major bridges connecting Bergen to neighbouring municipalities: the Nordhordland Bridge, the Askøy Bridge, the Sotra Bridge and the Osterøy Bridge. Bergen connects to the island of Bjorøy via the subsea Bjorøy Tunnel.

Bergen Station is the terminus of the Bergen Line, which runs  to Oslo. Vy operates express trains to Oslo and the Bergen Commuter Rail to Voss. Between Bergen and Arna Station, the train runs about every 30minutes through the Ulriken Tunnel; there is no corresponding road tunnel, forcing road vehicles to travel via Åsane or Nesttun.

Bergen is one of the smallest cities in Europe to have both tram and trolleybus electric urban transport systems simultaneously. Public transport in Hordaland is managed by Skyss, which operates an extensive city bus network in Bergen and to many neighbouring municipalities, including one route which operates as a trolleybus. The trolleybus system in Bergen is the only one still in operation in Norway and one of two trolleybus systems in Scandinavia.

The modern tram Bergen Light Rail (Bybanen) opened between the city centre and Nesttun in 2010, extended to Rådal (Lagunen Storsenter) in 2013 and to the Bergen airport Flesland in 2017. Extensions to other boroughs may occur later. Fløibanen is a funicular which runs from the city centre to Mount Fløyen and Ulriksbanen is an aerial tramway which runs to Mount Ulriken.

Culture and sports

Bergens Tidende (BT) and Bergensavisen (BA) are the largest newspapers, with circulations of 87,076 and 30,719 in 2006, BT is a regional newspaper covering all of Vestland, while BA focuses on metropolitan Bergen. Other newspapers published in Bergen include the Christian national Dagen, with a circulation of 8.936, and TradeWinds, an international shipping newspaper. Local newspapers are Fanaposten for Fana, Sydvesten for Laksevåg and Fyllingsdalen and Bygdanytt for Arna and the neighbouring municipality Osterøy. TV 2, Norway's largest private television company, is based in Bergen.

The 1,500-seat Grieg Hall is the city's main cultural venue, and home of the Bergen Philharmonic Orchestra, founded in 1765, and the Bergen Woodwind Quintet. The city also features Carte Blanche, the Norwegian national company of contemporary dance. The annual Bergen International Festival is the main cultural festival, which is supplemented by the Bergen International Film Festival. Two internationally renowned composers from Bergen are Edvard Grieg and Ole Bull. Grieg's home, Troldhaugen, has been converted to a museum. During the 1990s and early 2000s, Bergen produced a series of successful pop, rock and black metal artists, collectively known as the Bergen Wave.

Den Nationale Scene is Bergen's main theatre. Founded in 1850, it had Henrik Ibsen as one of its first in-house playwrights and art directors. Bergen's contemporary art scene is centred on BIT Teatergarasjen, Bergen Kunsthall, United Sardines Factory (USF) and Bergen Center for Electronic Arts (BEK). Bergen was a European Capital of Culture in 2000. Buekorps is a unique feature of Bergen culture, consisting of boys aged from 7 to 21 parading with imitation weapons and snare drums. The city's Hanseatic heritage is documented in the Hanseatic Museum located at Bryggen.

SK Brann is Bergen's premier football team; founded in 1908, they have played in the (men's) Norwegian Premier League for all but seven years since 1963 and consecutively, except one season after relegation in 2014, since 1987. The team were the football champions in 1961–1962, 1963, and 2007, and reached the quarter-finals of the Cup Winners' Cup in 1996–1997. Brann play their home games at the 17,824-seat Brann Stadion. FK Fyllingsdalen is the city's second-best team, playing in the Second Division at Varden Amfi. Its predecessor, Fyllingen, played in the Norwegian Premier League in 1990, 1991 and 1993. Arna-Bjørnar and Sandviken play in the Women's Premier League.

Bergen IK is the premier men's ice hockey team, playing at Bergenshallen in the First Division. Tertnes play in the Women's Premier Handball League, and Fyllingen in the Men's Premier Handball League. In athletics, the city is dominated by IL Norna-Salhus, IL Gular and FIK BFG Fana, formerly also Norrøna IL and TIF Viking. The Bergen Storm are an American football team that plays matches at  Varden Kunstgress and plays in the second division of the Norwegian league. 

Bergensk is the native dialect of Bergen. It was strongly influenced by Low German-speaking merchants from the mid-14th to mid-18th centuries. During the Dano-Norwegian period from 1536 to 1814, Bergen was more influenced by Danish than other areas of Norway. The Danish influence removed the female grammatical gender in the 16th century, making Bergensk one of very few Norwegian dialects with only two instead of three grammatical genders. The Rs are uvular trills, as in French, which probably spread to Bergen some time in the 18th century, overtaking the alveolar trill in the time span of two to three generations. Owing to an improved literacy rate, Bergensk was influenced by riksmål and bokmål in the 19th and 20th centuries. This led to large parts of the German-inspired vocabulary disappearing and pronunciations shifting slightly towards East Norwegian.

The 1986 edition of the Eurovision Song Contest took place in Bergen. Bergen was the host city for the 2017 UCI Road World Championships. The city is also a member of the UNESCO Creative Cities Network in the category of gastronomy since 2015.

Music

Bergen has been the home of several notable alternative bands, collectively referred to as the Bergen Wave. These bands include Röyksopp and Kings of Convenience on the small, Bergen-based record label Tellé Records, as well as related side-projects, such as The Whitest Boy Alive and Kommode, on independent labels. Other internationally well-received artists also originating from Bergen include Aurora, Sondre Lerche, Kygo, Boy Pablo and Alan Walker. Bergen is also known as the "black metal capital of Norway", due to its role in the early Norwegian black metal scene and the amount of acts to come from the city in the early 1990s.

Bergen is also the birthplace of composer Edvard Grieg.

Street art
Bergen is considered to be the street art capital of Norway. Famed artist Banksy visited the city in 2000 and inspired many to start creating street art. Soon after, the city brought up the most famous street artist in Norway: Dolk. His art can still be seen in several places in the city, and in 2009 the city council choose to preserve Dolk's work "Spray" with protective glass. In 2011, Bergen council launched a plan of action for street art in Bergen from 2011 to 2015 to ensure that "Bergen will lead the fashion for street art as an expression both in Norway and Scandinavia".

The Madam Felle (1831–1908) monument in Sandviken, is in honour of a Norwegian woman of German origin, who in the mid-19th century managed, against the will of the council, to maintain a counter of beer. A well-known restaurant of the same name is now situated at another location in Bergen. The monument was erected in 1990 by sculptor Kari Rolfsen, supported by an anonymous donor. Madam Felle, civil name Oline Fell, was remembered after her death in a popular song, possibly originally a folksong, "Kjenner Dokker Madam Felle?" by Lothar Lindtner and Rolf Berntzen on an album in 1977.

Media

Newspapers
Fjordaposten (1923–1940)

Neighbourhoods
The traditional neighbourhoods of Bergen include Bryggen, Eidemarken, Engen, Fjellet,

Kalfaret, Ladegården, Løvstakksiden, Marken, Minde,

Møhlenpris, Nordnes, Nygård, Nøstet, Sandviken,

Sentrum, Skansen, Skuteviken, Strandsiden, Stølen, Sydnes,

Verftet, Vågsbunnen, Wergeland, and Ytre Sandviken.

Grunnkretser
The various addresses in Bergen, each belong to one of the various grunnkrets.

International business
Each year Bergen sells the Christmas Tree seen in Newcastle's Haymarket as a sign of the ongoing friendship between the sister cities. The Nordic friendship cities of Bergen, Gothenburg, Turku and Aarhus arrange inter-Nordic camps each year by registering tenth grade school classes from each of the other cities to school camps, for a profit. Bergen received a totem pole as a gift of friendship from the city of Seattle on the city's 900th anniversary in 1970. It is now placed in the Nordnes Park and gazes out over the sea towards the friendship city far to the west.

Twin towns – sister cities

Bergen is twinned with:
 Aarhus, Denmark (since 1946)
 Gothenburg, Sweden (since 1946)
 Newcastle, England, United Kingdom (since 1968)
 Rostock, Germany (since 1957)
 Seattle, United States (since 1967)
 Turku, Finland (since 1946)

Notable people from Bergen 
List of people from Bergen

References

Bibliography

External links

Municipality website in Norwegian and English
 German U-Boat Base in Bergen

 
Municipalities of Vestland
Populated coastal places in Norway
1070 establishments in Europe
Populated places established in the 11th century
Port cities and towns in Norway
Port cities and towns of the North Sea
Former capitals of Norway
Viking Age populated places
Trading posts of the Hanseatic League
11th-century establishments in Norway